The Bangwa forest warbler or Bangwa scrub warbler (Bradypterus bangwaensis) is a species of Old World warbler in the family Locustellidae.
It is found in Cameroon and Nigeria.
Its natural habitats are subtropical or tropical moist montane forests and subtropical or tropical high-altitude shrubland.
It is threatened by habitat loss.

References

Bangwa forest warbler
Birds of Central Africa
Bangwa forest warbler
Bangwa forest warbler]
Taxonomy articles created by Polbot
Fauna of the Cameroonian Highlands forests